The Pindad PS-01 (Pistol Serbu, literally Assault Pistol) is a PDW-caliber pistol developed by Pindad. Chambered in the locally produced 5.56x21mm armor-piercing ammunition with an 18-round magazine, it is presumably no longer manufactured as of now.

History
The PS-01 was developed by Colonel Rihahanto, who developed the pistol from August to September 2007.

After field tests were conducted, the Indonesian military dropped the PS-01 from consideration since it did not have full auto capabilities.

Development
The PS-01 can be equipped with a silencer on the barrel with pistol-based tactical accessories attached underneath the barrel.

References

Semi-automatic pistols of Indonesia
5.56 mm firearms